The following is a list of pipeline accidents in the United States in 2023. It is one of several lists of U.S. pipeline accidents. See also list of natural gas and oil production accidents in the United States.

Incidents 
This is not a complete list of all pipeline accidents. For natural gas alone, the Pipeline and Hazardous Materials Safety Administration (PHMSA), a United States Department of Transportation agency, has collected data on more than 3,200 accidents deemed serious or significant since 1987.

A "significant incident" results in any of the following consequences:

 fatality or injury requiring in-patient hospitalization
 $50,000 or more in total costs, measured in 1984 dollars
 liquid releases of five or more barrels (42 US gal/barrel)
 releases resulting in an unintentional fire or explosion

PHMSA and the National Transportation Safety Board (NTSB) post incident data, and results of investigations, into accidents involving pipelines that carry a variety of products, including natural gas, oil, diesel fuel, gasoline, kerosene, jet fuel, carbon dioxide, and other substances. Occasionally pipelines are repurposed to carry different products.

 On January 4, Colonial Pipeline's Line 3 leaked about 2,500 gallons of petroleum products, near Danville, Virginia. The cause was not immediately known.

References 

Lists of pipeline accidents in the United States
2023 disasters in the United States